The Northwestern National Life Building, later known as the ReliaStar Building, then known as ING 20 Washington and now known as Voya Financial 20 Washington, is an office building located in the Gateway District of Minneapolis. It was designed by Minoru Yamasaki as the headquarters of the Northwestern National Life Insurance Company and was opened in 1965. The building was constructed to replace the Northwestern National Life Insurance Company Home Office near Loring Park, which had become too small for the number of employees in the company.

The building features an  portico that serves as the visual terminus for the Nicollet Mall. Yamasaki said that his design was intended to be "appropriate to an office building, monumental and dignified, yet graceful."  The building is framed by about 63 slender quartz-faced concrete columns. He said the porch at the main entrance would be "delicate" and "a delight to walk through". Yamasaki's touches also included reflective pools and landscaping, and he claimed he was designing "a park with a building in it".

Architecture critic Larry Millett calls it, "a temple to the gods of underwriting, built by the gods of underwriting and mixing luxury and high camp in way that, say, Liberace would have appreciated."

The company had 475 employees working in the home office in 1964, when this building opened. In 1978, the company had 850 employees, with some working in nearby offices because the main building had been occupied to capacity. In 1978, Northwestern National Life announced plans to build a 20-story office tower across Marquette Avenue, which became 100 Washington Square. That building was designed to have two-thirds of its space available to rent to other tenants.

Gallery

References

Buildings and structures in Minneapolis
Office buildings completed in 1964
1964 establishments in Minnesota